The 2008 CSIO Spruce Meadows 'Masters' Tournament was an international show jumping competition that took place from September 3 to September 7, 2008 at Spruce Meadows in Calgary, Alberta, Canada.

Results

September 3

Zeidler Financial Cup

Finning Welcome

September 4

AKITA Drilling Cup

CANA Cup

September 5

EnCana Cup

ATCO Electric Circuit

September 6

BP Cup

BMO Nations' Cup

Nine teams of four riders competed in the $350,000 FEI Nations Cup event, the eighteenth event in the 2008 FEI Nations Cup series. There were two rounds to the event, with all teams placing and receiving financial prizes.

September 7

Suncor Energy Cup

CN International

Thirty-nine riders competed in the $1,000,000 CN International.

External links
Official website

 
CSIO Spruce Meadows 'Masters' Tournament